Adri van der Poel (born 17 June 1959) is a retired Dutch cyclist. Van der Poel was a professional from 1981 to 2000. His biggest wins included six classics, two stages of the Tour de France and the World Cyclo-Cross Championships in 1996. He also obtained the second place and silver medal in the World Road Championships in 1983 behind Greg LeMond and five second places in the World Cyclo-Cross championships. The Grand Prix Adrie van der Poel is named after him.

Career
Van der Poel began his career on the road and during his first season as a professional he obtained second place in Paris–Nice behind Stephen Roche and second place in the La Flèche Wallonne. In the Tour de France, he won two stages; his stage win in 1988 set the record for fastest stage (since then only surpassed by three cyclists). Van der Poel also competed in cyclo-cross during the winter and obtained great results – that he turned full-time to cyclo-cross in the latter part of his career where he won the World Championships in 1996 and the World Cup and Superprestige classifications in 1997. Van der Poel retired after the 2000 Cyclo-Cross World Championships where he finished fourth and which was won by his teammate Richard Groenendaal.

In 1983 he tested positive for strychnine. He said that his father-in-law had served a pigeon pie for Sunday lunch, and only when he tested positive did he realise that the pigeons had been doped with strychnine.

Family
Van der Poel is the son-in-law of the famous French cyclist Raymond Poulidor. His sons David and Mathieu are also cyclists. Mathieu van der Poel became cyclo-cross world champion himself in the junior race in 2012 (Koksijde) and 2013 (Louisville, Kentucky) and then matching his father's title in 2015 (Tábor, Czech Republic), 2019, 2020 and 2021, and added wins in the prestigious Tour of Flanders in 2020 and Strade Bianche in 2021. 

Van der Poel's brother Jacques was also a professional cyclist from 1986 to 1992.

Major results

Cyclo-cross

1983–1984
 Superprestige
1st Zürich-Waid
1984–1985
 2nd  UCI World Championships
 Superprestige
3rd Gavere
1986–1987
 1st  National Championships
1987–1988
 2nd  UCI World Championships
1988–1989
 1st  National Championships
 2nd  UCI World Championships
 Superprestige
2nd Wetzikon
1989–1990
 1st  National Championships
 2nd  UCI World Championships
1990–1991
 1st  National Championships
 Superprestige
1st Gavere
2nd Gieten
 2nd  UCI World Championships
1991–1992
 1st  National Championships
 Superprestige
2nd Gavere
 3rd  UCI World Championships
1992–1993
 Superprestige
1st Valkenswaard
3rd Roma
1993–1994
 1st  National Championships
 UCI World Cup
2nd Loenhout
3rd Igorre
 Superprestige
2nd Overijse
1994–1995
 3rd Overall Superprestige
1st Overijse
1st Diegem
2nd Harnes
3rd Wetzikon
1995–1996
 1st  UCI World Championships
 UCI World Cup
1st Pontchâteau
 3rd Overall Superprestige
1st Sint Michielsgestel
2nd Wetzikon
3rd Diegem
3rd Harnes
 1st Surhuisterveen
 1st Vossem
1996–1997
 1st  Overall UCI World Cup
1st Praha
1st Koksijde
 1st Overall Superprestige
1st Gieten
1st Milan
1st Sint Michielsgestel
1st Harnes
 1st Woerden
 1st Kalmthout
 1st Nommay
 1st Essen
 1st Loenhout
 1st Haegendorf
1997–1998
 2nd Overall Superprestige
1st Diegem
1st Wetzikon
2nd Gieten
2nd Overijse
2nd Harnes
3rd Silvelle
3rd Milano
 2nd Overall UCI World Cup
2nd Eschenbach
2nd Praha
2nd Koksijde
2nd Heerlen
3rd Pontchâteau
 1st Harderwijk
 1st Niel
 1st Rijkevorsel
 1st Zeddam
 1st Loenhout
 1st Surhuisterveen
1998–1999
 1st  National Championships
 UCI World Cup
1st Nommay
3rd Koksijde
 3rd Overall Superprestige
1st Harnes
2nd Wetzikon
3rd Silvelle
3rd Diegem
 1st Pijnacker
 1st Montevrain
 3rd  UCI World Championships
1999–2000
 1st Harderwijk
 1st Lutterbach
 Gazet van Antwerpen
2nd Essen
 3rd Overall Superprestige
2nd Overijse
2nd Diegem
3rd Ruddervoorde
3rd Surhuisterveen
3rd Heerlen
 2nd National Championships
 UCI World Cup
3rd Leudelange
3rd Kalmthout

Road

1980
 7th Road race, Olympic Games
1981
 1st Stage 1 Critérium du Dauphiné Libéré
 2nd Overall Paris–Nice
1st Stage 3
 2nd La Flèche Wallonne
1982
 1st Züri-Metzgete
 1st Stage 4 Paris–Nice
1983
 1st Prologue Tour de Luxembourg
 2nd  Road race, UCI World Championships
 3rd Giro di Lombardia
1984
 4th Overall Tirreno–Adriatico
1st Points classification
1st Stage 4
1985
 1st Brabantse Pijl
 1st Clásica de San Sebastián
 1st Paris–Brussels
 1st Scheldeprijs
 Tour de Luxembourg
1st Stages 1 & 4
 2nd Overall Nissan Classic
1st Stage 5
 2nd Giro di Lombardia
 3rd Overall Three Days of De Panne
1986
 1st Tour of Flanders
 1st Nationale Sluitingsprijs
 2nd Liège–Bastogne–Liège
 3rd Paris–Roubaix
 3rd Züri-Metzgete
 6th Overall Nissan Classic
1987
 1st  Road race, National Championships
 1st Paris–Tours
 1st Grand Prix des Fourmies
 1st Grand Prix of Aargau Canton
 1st Stage 9 Tour de France
 Tour de Suisse
1st Stage 1 & 2
1988
 1st  Overall Étoile de Bessèges
1st Stage 2
 1st Liège–Bastogne–Liège
 1st Stage 16 Tour de France
 3rd Tour of Flanders
 3rd Grand Prix d'Ouverture La Marseillaise
1989
 1st Stage 6 Paris–Nice
 1st Stage 5 Tour Méditerranéen
 2nd Brabantse Pijl
 2nd E3 Prijs Vlaanderen
1990
 1st Amstel Gold Race
 1st Grand Prix of Aargau Canton
 2nd Grand Prix d'Ouverture La Marseillaise
1991
 1st Circuito de Getxo
 1st Stage 4 Ronde van Nederland
1992
 2nd Overall Tour of Britain
1994
 1st Profronde van Heerlen

See also
 List of Dutch Olympic cyclists
 List of doping cases in cycling
 List of Dutch cyclists who have led the Tour de France general classification

References

1959 births
Living people
Dutch male cyclists
Dutch Tour de France stage winners
Dutch sportspeople in doping cases
People from Woensdrecht
Doping cases in cycling
Cyclo-cross cyclists
UCI Cyclo-cross World Champions (men)
UCI Road World Championships cyclists for the Netherlands
Olympic cyclists of the Netherlands
Cyclists at the 1980 Summer Olympics
Cyclists from North Brabant